Dan McKellar (born 17 July 1976) is an Australian professional rugby union coach. He currently works as an Assistant coach for the Australian national rugby union team, was previously the head coach of Super Rugby team the Brumbies and was also head coach of the University of Canberra Vikings in Australia's National Rugby Championship.

Early life
McKellar grew up in Burdekin in North Queensland. He was introduced to rugby at Townsville Grammar School. He played first grade club rugby as a teenager, helping the Burdekin Canetoads win the Townsville premiership in 1994.

Rugby career
As a loosehead prop, McKellar played more than 150 premier grade games over a decade at Souths Rugby Club in Brisbane, winning a premiership in 2000. He was a member of the Queensland Reds Super Rugby squad in 2005 and 2006. He also had stints playing overseas in Scotland and Ireland. McKellar began learning the art of coaching at Wicklow, a small rugby club just outside Dublin in Ireland. He was playing in the team and acting as his side's assistant coach in 2001, and took over the main player-coach role from 2002 to 2005.

Coaching career
McKellar was a premier grade assistant coach at Souths Rugby Club in Brisbane in 2007, and the head coach from 2008 to 2010. He was appointed as coaching director and head coach of the Tuggeranong Vikings Rugby Club in Canberra for seasons 2011 and 2012 which included back to back premierships in premier grade. He also set up the professional rugby academy at the Vikings Club. In February 2013, McKellar moved to Japan to take up a position as forwards coach of Top League team NTT DoCoMo Red Hurricanes.

Returning to Canberra, he signed with the Brumbies as the club's defence and skills coach for the 2014 Super Rugby season. After the launch of the National Rugby Championship, he was appointed as head coach of the University of Canberra Vikings team to play in the new competition.

McKellar was appointed as head coach of the Brumbies for the 2018 season following Stephen Larkham's departure.

In August 2021 it was announced McKellar would wind up a successful five-year stint as Brumbies head coach at the end of the 2022 Super Rugby season and would remain in his position with the Australia national team. During his time as Brumbies head coach he led the side to the Super Rugby Semi-Final in 2019, and back-to-back Super Rugby AU Grand-Finals in 2020–21, famously taking out the 2020 title in front of a home crowd at GIO Stadium.

After holding his role within the Australia national team since 2021, McKellar resigned from his job to join English Premiership team the Leicester Tigers, effective from 1 July 2023.

References

1976 births
Living people
Australian rugby union coaches
Australian rugby union players
ACT Brumbies coaches
Rugby union props